Yadavaran Shalamcheh is an Iranian football club based in Khorramshahr, Iran. They currently compete in the Iran Football's 3rd Division. They competed last season in Azadegan League but was soon relegated to the 2nd Division. They relegation was increased to 3rd Division due to match-fixing scandal.

History
In September 2012, they bought the license of Sanati Kaveh football club in order to participate in 2012–13 Azadegan League.

Season-by-Season
The table below shows the achievements of the club in various competitions.

See also
 Hazfi Cup
 Sanati Kaveh

References

External links
  Official club website
  Players and Results

Football clubs in Iran
Association football clubs established in 2012